The Equation of Love and Death is a 2008 Chinese dramatic film written and directed by Cao Baoping and starring Zhou Xun. The film is a Chinese (Huayi Brothers) and Hong Kong (Sundream Motion Pictures) co-production. It is Cao's second solo feature after 2006's Trouble Makers.

The Equation of Love and Death premiered in China on September 18, 2008 in Shanghai and had its North American premiere at the 2008 Vancouver International Film Festival where it was part of the Dragons and Tigers side competition.

The Equation of Love and Death tells the story of Li Mi (played by Zhou Xun), a Kunming cab driver who longs for the day she can be reunited with her missing boyfriend. After a case of mistaken identity, a kidnapping, and a threat of extortion, Li Mi's dream may be on the cusp of becoming a reality.

Plot 
Li Mi, a chain smoking taxi driver in the Chinese city of Kunming has been searching fruitlessly for her lost boyfriend for years. One day she picks up two strangers which turn out to be desperate criminals (Wang Baoqiang and Wang Yanhui) engaged in drug smuggling and importation of narcotics ingested in their stomachs. The two men kidnap Li and force her to drive to a designated location, however midway on a refuel stop at a petrol station, she signals to the attendant to call for help. After escapes, Yanhui dies due to the leakage of the package inside his stomach resulting in organ failure. The film ends with her finding out the fate of her boyfriend who left her a safe deposit box of money and a letter telling her to start a grocery store.

Cast 
 Zhou Xun as Li Mi, the film's heroine, Li Mi is a chain-smoking cabbie. Her boyfriend disappeared years ago, but she still reads and memorizes the letters that he occasionally sends her.
 Zhang Hanyu as Ye Qingcheng, a police detective who becomes involved in Li Mi's story.
 Actor Deng Chao plays two roles in the film: as Fang Wen, Li Mi's long lost boyfriend, Ma Bing, a man who may be Fang Wen in disguise.
 Wang Ning as Feifei, Yanhui's wife.
 Wang Baoqiang as Qiu Shuitian, one of Li Mi's passengers, a bumbling drug smuggler.
 Wang Yanhui as Qiu Huogui, another of Li Mi's passengers, another smuggler.

Reception 
Early reviews by western critics suggested that Cao Baoping's sophomore film was a stylish thriller/drama, but that much depended on the power of Zhou Xun's performance as Li Mi. Shelly Kraicer, the Chinese film scholar and curator of the Vancouver International Film Festival's Dragons and Tigers competition noted that while director "Cao Baoping is an expert at orchestrating frenzy," the film ultimately belonged to Zhou Xun. Despite the praise, the film would not go on to win the award (which went to Emily Tang's Perfect Life). Variety critic Derek Elley also wrote in his review that the film was "motored by another saturated [performance] by the throaty-voiced Zhou."

Other critics saw the film as yet another example of China's growing sophistication with "genre films." The China Film Journal in its final verdict argued that while the film was not "life-changing," it was nevertheless a "step in the right direction" and that audiences would not mind "seeing a few more Memento-esque films" coming out of China in the near future.

The film won the Altadis New Directors Award at the 2008 San Sebastian International Film Festival.

Accolades

References

External links 
  Official site
 
 The Equation of Love and Death at the Chinese Movie Database
 The Equation of Love and Death at Cinemasie

2008 films
Chinese romantic thriller films
Films set in Kunming
2000s Mandarin-language films
2000s romantic thriller films
Films directed by Cao Baoping